Hans Baumann (born 14 July 1905, date of death unknown) was a Swiss modern pentathlete who competed at the 1936 Summer Olympics, and was one of three competitors among 42 who did not finish the competition, alongside Alexandros Baltatzis-Mavrokorlatis of Greece and José Escribens of Peru. In the individual events, he was ranked seventh in riding and thirty-seventh in fencing and shooting prior to dropping out in the swimming event.

References

1905 births
Year of death missing
Swiss male modern pentathletes
Modern pentathletes at the 1936 Summer Olympics
Olympic modern pentathletes of Switzerland